Lilienthal Mountain is a  or  peak on the Columbia Plateau in Lincoln County, in the U.S. state of Washington. It is the highest point in Lincoln County.

References

Sources
 

Landforms of Lincoln County, Washington
Mountains of Washington (state)